The Belle Of The Turf Stakes is a Gosford Racing Club Group 3 Thoroughbred quality handicap horse race for fillies and mares three-years-old and older, over a distance of 1600 metres at Gosford Racecourse, Gosford, Australia in December. The prize money for the event is A$200,000.

History
The race prior to 2012 was run in October. The Gosford Racing Club moved the race to January, increasing the prizemoney to the race as well as the Gosford Cup and Takeover Target Stakes.

For the 2017–18 season the race was moved to December as part of the Central Coast Carnival.

Grade
1988–2013 - Listed race
2014 onwards - Group 3

Winners

 2021 - Expat
 2020 - Threeood
2019 - Tinkermosa
2018 - Sexy Eyes
2017 (December) - Pecans 
2017 (January) - Imposing Lass
2016 - Ammirata
2015 - Mamwaazel
2014 - Myamira
2013 - Cathay Lady
2012 - race not held
2011 - Skyerush
2010 - Hidden Wonder
2009 - Messenger
2008 - Prima Nova
2007 - race not held
2006 - Pekalan
2005 - Wild Queen
2004 - Hec Of A Party
2003 - Imperatrix
2002 - Rosa Marada
2001 - Dandify
2000 - Avilde
1999 - Rubitoff
1998 - St Pamela Ann
1997 - The Essence
1996 - Money Thinks
1995 - Macrosa
1994 - Diversify
1993 - race not held
1992 - Pusan
1991 - Volcanic
1990 - Happy Sailing
1989 - Come On Up
1988 - St. Klaire 

Notes:

See also
 List of Australian Group races
 Group races

References

Horse races in Australia